Daegu Metro Line 1 was, until mid-2005, the only rapid transit line in the South Korean city of Daegu. It is operated by the Daegu Metropolitan Transit Corporation. The line color is ●carmine.

The line first began running from Jincheon to Jungangno on November 26, 1997. The section from Jungnangno to Ansim was opened shortly thereafter, on May 2, 1998. The west end of the line was extended from Jincheon to Daegok, reaching its current length on May 10, 2002. However, service on the entire line was stopped for several months in 2003 following the Daegu subway fire.

Line 1's 28.4 kilometer course lies entirely within the metropolitan city of Daegu, although proposals have been made to extend it into the northern end of Gyeongsan city. , trains run 312 times per day during the week, and 288 times on weekends and holidays. It takes 50 minutes and 30 seconds to go from one end to the other. A southwestern extension was opened on September 8, 2016.

Stations 
The following is the list of stations from west to east. All train doors open on the right when arriving at the station (except Ansim Station)

See also
1995 Daegu gas explosions
Transportation in South Korea
Daegu Metro Line 2

References

External links
Daegu Metropolitan Transit Corporation

Daegu subway lines
Railway lines opened in 1997